Malarguesaurus (meaning "Malargue lizard" after the Malargüe Department of Mendonza Province) is a genus of titanosauriform sauropod dinosaur from the Late Cretaceous of Mendoza Province, Argentina.  Its fossils, consisting of tail vertebrae, chevrons, ribs, and limb bones, were found in the upper Turonian-lower Coniacian Portezuelo Formation of the Neuquén Group. The type species, described by González Riga et al. in 2008, is M. florenciae.

Description 
Described as a robust sauropod, it was initially described as being closely related to Ligabuesaurus and Phuwiangosaurus, and Mannion et al. (2013) more precisely recovered it as a member of Somphospondyli. The cladistic analysis of Patagotitan recovered Malarguesaurus as a close relative of the Asian Ruyangosaurus.

Like other sauropods, Malarguesaurus would have been a large quadrupedal herbivore. Malarguesaurus is the second sauropod dinosaur discovered in Mendoza Province; the first is Mendozasaurus neguyelap.

References

External links 
 Malarguesaurus and other South American sauropods

Titanosaurs
Coniacian life
Turonian life
Late Cretaceous dinosaurs of South America
Cretaceous Argentina
Fossils of Argentina
Neuquén Group
Fossil taxa described in 2008